Richard Bernice "Pete" Cooper (December 31, 1914 – October 8, 1993) was an American professional golfer on the PGA Tour in the 1940s and 1950s; he was best known for winning the 1976 PGA Seniors' Championship.

Cooper turned professional in 1938. In the ten-year span between 1949 and 1958, he won five official PGA Tour events and had runner-up finishes in the 1950 Houston Open and the 1955 Tournament of Champions. His best finish in a major was T4 at the 1953 U.S. Open. He helped a young Chi-Chi Rodríguez improve enough to secure a spot on the PGA Tour.

Cooper won the 1976 PGA Seniors' Championship at the age of 61 with a four-day total of 283 over runner-up Fred Wampler. The tournament was held at Walt Disney World in Orlando, Florida.

Cooper lived in Lakeland, Florida, where he owned the Par 3 and Lone Palm Golf Club. He was also active in golf course design.

Professional wins (23)

PGA Tour wins (5)

PGA Tour playoff record (1–1)

Sources:

Other  wins (17)
this list is probably incomplete
1944 Florida Open
1946 Florida Open
1948 Florida Open
1949 Florida Open
1950 Florida Open
1953 Metropolitan Open
1954 Orlando Two-ball (with Patty Berg)
1956 Michigan Open
1957 Florida Open
1958 Florida Open
1959 Panama Open, Puerto Rico Open, Colombian Open
1960 Jamaica Open, Maracaibo Open
1961 Panama Open
1966 Florida Open

Senior wins (1)
1976 PGA Seniors' Championship

Team appearances
Canada Cup (representing Puerto Rico): 1961

See also
List of golfers with most PGA Tour wins

References

External links

Notice of Pete Cooper's death

American male golfers
PGA Tour golfers
PGA Tour Champions golfers
Golf course architects
Golfers from Florida
Sportspeople from Lakeland, Florida
1914 births
1993 deaths